An adaptive k-d tree is a tree for multidimensional points where successive levels may be split along different dimensions.

References 

 

Trees (data structures)
Geometric data structures